Handewitt is a municipality in the district of Schleswig-Flensburg, in Schleswig-Holstein, Germany. It is situated near the border with Denmark, approx. 7 km west of Flensburg.

Handball 

The Handball-Bundesliga team SG Flensburg-Handewitt is extremely successful. It has won the EHF Cup in 1997, in 2001 and 2012 the EHF Cup Winners' Cup, DHB-Pokal in 2003, 2004, 2005 and 2015, the German championship in 2004, 2018 and 2019, and 2014 the EHF Champions League.

Economy 
Close to the A7 motorway, the shopping and commercial center Scandinavian Park is aimed primarily at customers from Scandinavia. It covers 125,000 m² and opened in 2006. One of the biggest companies is Dänisches Bettenlager, the German branch of Jysk, with its administration for about 1000 shops in Germany and Austria.

See also 
Handewitt (Amt)

References 

Schleswig-Flensburg